Ethridge is an unincorporated community in Toole County, Montana, United States. It is located on U.S. Route 2, and is a grain storage and shipping point on the Hi-Line. The community has a post office with ZIP code 59435.

Glacier Wind Farm is located south of Ethridge off U.S. Route 2, between the cities of Cut Bank and Shelby, and spans about 25,000 acres.

Sometime in early 1900, the Great Northern Railway station named Galt was renamed Ethridge.

References

External links 

 Ethridge, Montana’s Beautiful Grain Elevator, Take My Trip.com

Unincorporated communities in Toole County, Montana
Unincorporated communities in Montana